Naples Memorial Town Hall is a historic town hall located at Naples in Ontario County, New York. It was built in 1870–72 and is a lavish and imposing, two story rectangular brick building in the Italianate style.  It was designed by A. J. Warner & Company, the Rochester partnership of A. J. Warner and Charles Coots.  The town hall served as the center of the village and town's social and recreational activities until World War II. Between 1942 and 1972, the building was in private hands and served a variety of commercial and light industrial uses.  In 1972, it was reacquired by the town and serves as a community center and host site for the annual Naples Grape Festival.

It was listed on the National Register of Historic Places in 1996.

Gallery

References

External links
Memorial Town Hall, Naples, NY - American Civil War Monuments and Memorials on Waymarking.com

City and town halls on the National Register of Historic Places in New York (state)
Italianate architecture in New York (state)
Government buildings completed in 1872
Buildings and structures in Ontario County, New York
National Register of Historic Places in Ontario County, New York